Homer Township may refer to:

Illinois
 Homer Township, Will County, Illinois

Iowa
 Homer Township, Benton County, Iowa
 Homer Township, Buchanan County, Iowa

Michigan
 Homer Township, Calhoun County, Michigan
 Homer Township, Midland County, Michigan

Minnesota
 Homer Township, Winona County, Minnesota

Missouri
 Homer Township, Bates County, Missouri

Ohio
 Homer Township, Medina County, Ohio
 Homer Township, Morgan County, Ohio

Pennsylvania
 Homer Township, Potter County, Pennsylvania

South Dakota
 Homer Township, Day County, South Dakota, in Day County, South Dakota

Township name disambiguation pages